The Stelton Baptist Church is in the Stelton section of Edison, Middlesex County, New Jersey. It is the second oldest Baptist Church in New Jersey and the tenth oldest in the United States.

History

The congregation was formed in the spring of 1689, and among its original members was the Stelle family, after whom the Stelton section of Edison, New Jersey is named. Up until 1875 the church was known as the First Baptist Church of Piscataway. The land occupied by the church and cemetery at Stelton was purchased in April 1731. The first church was erected in 1748, and that building was taken down and rebuilt in 1825. This building was destroyed by a fire on New Year's Day, January 1, 1851. In 1870 portions of Piscataway, New Jersey and Woodbridge, New Jersey were used to form Raritan, New Jersey. The site of the church later became Edison, New Jersey. The building which took its place was destroyed in a fire in 1924. The present building was erected in 1925. The cemetery contains hundreds of early burials, including Andrew Drake. The first female pastor of the congregation, the Rev. Kathleen Tice, was installed in 1999. After 10 years of service at the congregation, Pastor Tice retired during the summer of 2010.

References

External links 
 
 Stelton Baptist Church at Blogspot

Baptist churches in New Jersey
Cemeteries in Middlesex County, New Jersey
Edison, New Jersey
Churches in Middlesex County, New Jersey
1689 establishments in New Jersey
Colonial architecture in New Jersey